Nicholas Richard Greenwood (born September 28, 1987) is an American former professional baseball pitcher. He played in Major League Baseball (MLB) for the St. Louis Cardinals.

Career

San Diego Padres
Greenwood was drafted by the San Diego Padres in the 14th round, with the 414th overall selection, of the 2009 Major League Baseball Draft out of the University of Rhode Island, where he played college baseball for the Rhode Island Rams baseball team.

St. Louis Cardinals
He was acquired by the St. Louis Cardinals as part of a three-team trade on July 31, 2010, in which the Padres acquired Ryan Ludwick, the Cleveland Indians acquired Corey Kluber, and the Cardinals also added Jake Westbrook.

The Cardinals called Greenwood up to the majors for the first time on June 15, 2014, when his contract was purchased from the Triple-A Memphis Redbirds. He made his major league debut on June 16, 2014, and pitched for the Cardinals again the next season. He was designated for assignment by the Cardinals on September 9, 2015.

Chicago Cubs
On January 25, 2016, Greenwood signed a minor league contract with the Chicago Cubs. An invite to spring training was also included. He was released in March.

New Britain Bees
On April 7, 2016, Greenwood signed with the New Britain Bees of the Atlantic League of Professional Baseball.

Minnesota Twins
On May 6, 2016, Greenwood signed a minor league deal with the Minnesota Twins. On December 30, Greenwood re-signed with the Twins. He was released on June 10, without having made an appearance for the Twins in 2017 due to injury.

New Britain Bees
On June 20, 2017, Greenwood signed with the New Britain Bees of the Atlantic League of Professional Baseball. He became a free agent after the 2017 season.

References

External links

Rhode Island Rams bio

1987 births
Living people
Baseball players from Connecticut
Major League Baseball pitchers
St. Louis Cardinals players
Rhode Island Rams baseball players
Eugene Emeralds players
Fort Wayne TinCaps players
Quad Cities River Bandits players
Palm Beach Cardinals players
Springfield Cardinals players
Memphis Redbirds players
New Britain Bees players
People from Southington, Connecticut
Chattanooga Lookouts players
Bravos de Margarita players
American expatriate baseball players in Venezuela
Caribes de Anzoátegui players
Águilas Cibaeñas players
American expatriate baseball players in the Dominican Republic
People from Cromwell, Connecticut